Flat Lake Provincial Park is a provincial park in British Columbia, Canada.

References

Cariboo Regional District
Thompson-Nicola Regional District
Provincial parks of British Columbia
1995 establishments in British Columbia
Protected areas established in 1995